Michael R. Dreeben (born  1954) is a former Deputy Solicitor General who was in charge of the U.S. Department of Justice criminal docket before the United States Supreme Court. He is recognized as an expert in U.S. criminal law.

Dreeben had a lengthy career in the Solicitor General's office, starting as an Assistant in 1988, then promoted to Deputy in 1995. In his first case before the Supreme Court, United States v. Halper (1989), he was opposed by John Roberts, who later became Chief Justice. In 2016 Dreeben became only the seventh person to argue 100 cases before the Supreme Court. In 2017, he was enlisted by special counsel Robert Mueller to assist the investigation of Russia's interventions into the 2016 U.S. presidential election.

Dreeben is a Distinguished Lecturer at Georgetown Law, and has previously taught at Harvard Law School and Duke University Law School. In 2020 he became a partner at O'Melveny & Myers.

Selected publications

References

External links 
 
 List of cases argued by Michael Dreeben

1950s births
Living people
Lawyers who have represented the United States government
University of Wisconsin–Madison alumni
University of Chicago alumni
Duke University School of Law alumni
21st-century American lawyers
Members of the 2017 Special Counsel investigation team